This is the list of the number-one singles of the Finnish Singles Chart in 1994.

History

References

Number-one singles
Finland
1994